Reginald K. Meeks (born March 21, 1954) is a Democratic Party member of the Kentucky House of Representatives who represented District 42 from 2000 until his resignation on December 17, 2021.

References

External links
 Kentucky Legislature - Representative Reginald Meeks official KY Senate website
 Project Vote Smart - Representative Reginald K. Meeks (MT) profile
 Follow the Money - Reginald K Meeks
 2006 2004 2002 2000 campaign contributions

1954 births
21st-century American politicians
Living people
Democratic Party members of the Kentucky House of Representatives
Politicians from Louisville, Kentucky
Wabash College alumni
University of Iowa alumni
Native American state legislators